WHVT (90.5 FM) is a radio station  broadcasting a Christian radio format. Licensed to Clyde, Ohio, United States, the station is currently owned by the Clyde Educational Broadcasting Foundation.

WHVT is also heard in Findlay, Ohio through a translator on 94.1 FM.

References

External links

HVT